Cade Parker Cunningham (born September 25, 2001) is an American professional basketball player for the Detroit Pistons of the National Basketball Association (NBA). He attended Bowie High School in his hometown of Arlington, Texas, before transferring to Montverde Academy in Florida, where he was rated a consensus five-star recruit and among the top players in the 2020 class by major recruiting services. As a senior, he led one of the best high school teams in history and received national player of the year recognition. 

Cunningham committed to playing college basketball for Oklahoma State, and was named a consensus first-team All-American and Big 12 Player of the Year after his freshman season with the team. He won a gold medal with the United States at the 2019 FIBA Under-19 World Cup. He was the NBA first overall pick by the Detroit Pistons in the 2021 NBA draft.

Early life and career
Cunningham was born in Arlington, Texas, to Carrie and Keith Cunningham. He grew up playing football as a quarterback, which he believes helped him become a better passer and leader on the basketball court. Cunningham focused on basketball after watching his brother play the sport in college. He frequently played basketball with his father and brother at a recreation center. Cunningham played the point guard position for Barnett Junior High School in Arlington. Since his childhood, he competed for the Texas Titans on the Amateur Athletic Union circuit alongside future TCU player Mike Miles.

High school career
Cunningham attended Bowie High School in Arlington. Soon into his freshman season, he became a starter on the varsity team, which also featured Kyler Edwards. Cunningham averaged 15.2 points, 6.4 rebounds, and 3.0 assists per game, helping Bowie reach the District 6A Region I final. He was subsequently named District 4-6A Newcomer of the Year. In December 2017, early in his sophomore season, he suffered an injury while attempting to dunk at a tournament in Houston. Cunningham finished the season averaging 18.8 points, 8.2 rebounds, and 5.3 assists per game. He was named District 4-6A co-most valuable player (MVP) and earned Texas Association of Basketball Coaches All-Region honors.

Entering his junior year, Cunningham transferred to Montverde Academy, a school in Montverde, Florida with a successful basketball program. He chose Montverde, whose team was ranked number one in the country by USA Today, for its academics and coaching. On February 2, 2019, at the National Hoopfest tournament, Cunningham recorded 26 points, nine assists, and seven rebounds in a 76–51 win against Oak Hill Academy, one of the top high school teams nationally. By the end of his junior season, he was averaging 11.4 points, 5.7 rebounds, and 5.5 assists per game. Following the high school season, Cunningham was named Nike Elite Youth Basketball League (EYBL) MVP after averaging 25.1 points, 6.6 rebounds, and 5.2 assists per game for the Texas Titans in the EYBL regular season. He was teammates with Greg Brown and Mike Miles with the Titans.

For his senior season at Montverde, he was joined by many more top recruits, including five-star forwards Scottie Barnes and Day'Ron Sharpe. Many analysts regarded his team as one of the best in high school basketball history. Cunningham averaged 13.9 points, 6.4 assists and 4.2 rebounds per game, leading Montverde to a 25–0 record with an average margin of victory of 39 points. He played only 22 minutes per game due to the depth of his team. At the end of the season, Cunningham was honored as Mr. Basketball USA, Naismith Prep Player of the Year, and MaxPreps National Player of the Year. He was selected to play in the McDonald's All-American Game, Jordan Brand Classic, and Nike Hoop Summit, but all three games were canceled due to the COVID-19 pandemic.

Recruiting
Cunningham emerged as a top-25 recruit in the 2020 class at the end of his sophomore season at Bowie. He was a consensus five-star recruit and one of the best players in his class. Cunningham received offers from top NCAA Division I programs, including Duke, Kentucky, and North Carolina, but many analysts viewed Oklahoma State as his likely destination after the program hired his brother  as an assistant coach. On November 5, 2019, Cunningham announced his commitment to Oklahoma State. He became the highest-ranked committed recruit in program history and the first five-star recruit to join Oklahoma State since Marcus Smart in 2012. In June 2020, the NCAA imposed a postseason ban on Oklahoma State. Cunningham announced on June 22 that he would still play for the team.

College career

In his college debut for Oklahoma State on November 25, 2020, Cunningham recorded 21 points and 10 rebounds in a 75–68 win over UT Arlington. On December 8, he scored 29 points, including 13 in the final 91 seconds, in an 83–78 victory over Oral Roberts. On December 12, Cunningham made a game-winning three-pointer with 11 seconds remaining to help defeat Wichita State 67–64. On February 27, 2021, he posted a career-high 40 points and 11 rebounds in a 94–90 overtime win against Oklahoma. The performance helped him earn Oscar Robertson National Player of the Week honors. Cunningham posted 25 points, eight rebounds, and five assists in an 83–74 upset win against top-seeded Baylor in the Big 12 tournament semifinals on March 12, 2021. As a freshman, he averaged 20.1 points, 6.2 rebounds, 3.5 assists, and 1.6 steals per game. 

After his freshman season, Cunningham was recognized as a consensus first-team All-American. He was the first Oklahoma State player to earn the distinction since Bob Kurland (1944–46). He became the fourth player to win Big 12 Player of the Year and Big 12 Freshman of the Year in the same season, joining Marcus Smart, Kevin Durant, and Michael Beasley. He was unanimously selected to the first-team All-Big 12, the All-Freshman Team, and the All-Newcomer Team. Cunningham received major NCAA Division I freshman of the year honors, among them the Wayman Tisdale Award, Sporting News Freshman of the Year, and National Association of Basketball Coaches Freshman of the Year.

On April 1, 2021, Cunningham announced that he would enter the 2021 NBA draft and forgo his remaining college eligibility. Analysts regarded him as the consensus number one pick in the draft.

Professional career

Detroit Pistons (2021–present)
Cunningham was drafted with the first overall pick of the 2021 NBA draft by the Detroit Pistons. On August 8, 2021, he made his debut in the 2021 NBA Summer League in a 76–72 win against the Oklahoma City Thunder in which he posted 12 points, six rebounds, and two assists in 26 minutes. Cunningham lost part of the training camp, all of the preseason, and five of Detroit's first six games due to an ankle injury. On October 30, he made his NBA debut, putting up two points, two assists, and seven rebounds in a 110–103 win over the Orlando Magic. After five games, Cunningham posted his first 40-plus field-goal percentage, and he had an 18-point, 10-rebound double-double in his third NBA game. On November 15, Cunningham became the youngest player in NBA history to tally at least 25 points, eight rebounds, and eight assists with five three-pointers in a game at 20 years, 51 days. He topped LeBron James (20 years, 100 days) and Trae Young (20 years, 163 days). On November 21, he notched a triple-double with 13 points, 12 rebounds, and 10 assists in a 121—116 loss to the Los Angeles Lakers to become the eighth-youngest player in NBA history to record a triple-double and the youngest in Pistons history.

On January 25, 2022, Cunningham recorded 34 points, eight rebounds, eight assists, four blocks, and two steals in a 110–105 loss to the Denver Nuggets, joining Michael Jordan as the only rookies in NBA history to post these basketball statistics in a single game. He was named the NBA Eastern Conference Rookie of the Month for games played in January. Cunningham was named MVP of the Rising Stars Challenge on February 18, 2022. He averaged a rookie-best 17.4 points, plus 5.6 assists and 5.5 rebounds, to finish the season. After March 1, Cunningham averaged 21.2 points on 46.2 percent shooting and 6.7 assists per game. He finished third in Rookie of the Year voting, behind winner Scottie Barnes and Evan Mobley.

On October 28, 2022, Cunningham scored a career-high 35 points, along with recording nine rebounds and eight assists, during a 132–116 loss to the Atlanta Hawks. On December 12, it was announced Cunningham would undergo season-ending surgery to repair a stress fracture in his left shin. Prior to his injury, he averaged 19.9 points, 6.2 rebounds and six assists, shooting 41.5% overall and 27.9% on 3-point attempts in 12 games.

National team career
Cunningham played for the United States at the 2019 FIBA Under-19 World Cup in Heraklion, Greece. In seven games, he averaged 11.7 points, 5.7 assists, and 4.9 rebounds per game, helping his team win the gold medal. In the finals, Cunningham led all scorers with 21 points, along with seven rebounds and seven assists, in a 93–79 win over Mali.

Career statistics

NBA

|-
| style="text-align:left;"| 
| style="text-align:left;"| Detroit
| 64 || 64 || 32.6 || .416 || .314 || .845 || 5.5 || 5.6 || 1.2 || .7 || 17.4
|-
| style="text-align:left;"| 
| style="text-align:left;"| Detroit
| 12 || 12 || 33.3 || .415 || .279 || .837 || 6.2 || 6.0 || .8 || .6 || 19.9
|- class="sortbottom"
| style="text-align:center;" colspan="2"| Career
| 76 || 76 || 32.7 || .416 || .309 || .844 || 5.6 || 5.6 || 1.2 || .7 || 17.8

College

|-
| style="text-align:left;"| 2020–21
| style="text-align:left;"| Oklahoma State
| 27 || 26 || 35.4 || .438 || .400 || .846 || 6.2 || 3.5 || 1.6 || .8 || 20.1

Personal life
Cunningham's father Keith played college football for Texas Tech. His older brother  played college basketball for SMU, surpassing the school record for games played, before spending one professional season in Poland. Cannen later pursued a coaching career, becoming an assistant coach for Oklahoma State entering the 2019–20 season. Cunningham has a daughter named Riley, born in 2018. He has been a vegan since 2019.

References

External links

Oklahoma State Cowboys bio
Montverde Academy Eagles bio
USA Basketball bio

2001 births
Living people
All-American college men's basketball players
American men's basketball players
Basketball players from Texas
Detroit Pistons draft picks
Detroit Pistons players
McDonald's High School All-Americans
Montverde Academy alumni
Oklahoma State Cowboys basketball players
Point guards
Sportspeople from Arlington, Texas